Irving B. Green (also known as Irvin B. Green) (February 6, 1916 – July 1, 2006) was an American record industry executive, and founder and president of Mercury Records.

Biography
Green was born in Brooklyn, New York, the son of Sylvia (née Langler) and Albert "Al" Green, the founder of National Records. His father was Jewish. He was instrumental in promoting African-American artists such as Sarah Vaughan, Dinah Washington and the Platters.

In 1945, he founded Mercury Records, in Chicago, Illinois, along with Berle Adams and Arthur Talmadge, and helped turn the independent outfit into a major label.

In 1962, Green sold Mercury to Consolidated Electronics Industries Corporation (Conelco) an American affiliate of Dutch electronics giant Philips of the Netherlands but he remained Mercury Records' President. Green continued to run Mercury for five years after selling the company.

In 1964, Mercury Records became the first major record label to have a black high-level executive, when Green hired the trumpeter Quincy Jones as vice president.

After leaving Mercury, he became a successful real estate developer in Palm Springs and built over 18,000 homes in southern Iran with real-estate developer Bill Levitt.

Personal life
Green died on July 1, 2006 at the Desert Regional Medical Center in Palm Springs, California. He was survived by his wife Pamela and two daughters, Roberta Green Hunt and Kelli Green Ross. Services were held at Temple Isaiah in Palm Springs. He is buried in Desert Memorial Park in Cathedral City, California.

References

External links
 

1916 births
2006 deaths
Burials at Desert Memorial Park
Businesspeople from Chicago
Record producers from New York (state)
American people of Jewish descent
People from Brooklyn
20th-century American businesspeople